Eshgaft-e Jamushi (also Romanized as Eshgaft-e Jāmūshī; also known as Eshkaft-e Jāmūshī) is a village in Howmeh-ye Sharqi Rural District, in the Central District of Izeh County, Khuzestan Province, Iran. At the 2006 census, its population was 414, in 69 families.

References 

Populated places in Izeh County